Teen Wolf is an American supernatural drama developed by Jeff Davis loosely based upon the 1985 film of the same name and a screenplay by Jeph Loeb & Matthew Weisman, which premiered on June 5, 2011 on MTV. The series stars Tyler Posey as Scott McCall, a teenager who transforms into a werewolf after being bitten by one. 

A six-episode web series, "Search for a Cure", was produced and presented by AT&T and released alongside the first season in 2011. Accompanying the episodes of Season 3 Part 2, Season 4, and a number of episodes of Season 5 Part 1, the aftershow Wolf Watch aired after each episode on MTV, originally hosted by Jill Wagner, who was succeeded by Tyler Posey.

On July 21, 2016, the cast announced at Comic Con that the series would end after its sixth season. The series finale aired on September 24, 2017.

Series overview

Episodes

Season 1 (2011)

Season 2 (2012)

Season 3 (2013–14)

Season 4 (2014)

Season 5 (2015–16)

Season 6 (2016–17)

Specials

Search for a Cure

Revelations

Wolf Watch

Ratings

References

External links

Lists of American horror-supernatural television series episodes
Lists of American drama television series episodes
Lists of American teen drama television series episodes
Teen Wolf (2011 TV series)